Laurence Alan Tisch (March 5, 1923 – November 15, 2003) was an American businessman, investor and billionaire. He was the CEO of CBS television network from 1986 to 1995. With his brother Bob Tisch, he was part owner of Loews Corporation.

Early life
Tisch was born March 5, 1923, in Brooklyn, New York, the son of Sadye (née Brenner) and Al Tisch. His father's parents had emigrated from Ukraine and his mother's parents from Poland. He was of Jewish descent. His father, a former All-American basketball player at the City University of New York, owned a garment factory as well as two summer camps which his wife helped him run.

Education and early career
He graduated from New York University when he was just 18 and received a Penn Wharton MBA in industrial management by 20. In 1946, he made his first investment, purchasing a 300-room winter resort in Lakewood, New Jersey with $125,000 in seed money (roughly equivalent to $1.5 million at 2012 prices) from his parents. Two years later, his brother Bob joined him in the business, launching a lifelong partnership between the pair with Larry handling financial matters and Bob the overall management.

Their first hotel was very successful and over the next decade, the Tisch brothers bought a dozen hotels in Atlantic City and the Catskills.

Loews
In 1960, using the proceeds from their hotel empire, Tisch gained control of Loews Theaters, one of the largest movie house chains at the time, with Bob and Larry serving as co-chairmen of the company. They were attracted to Loews by its underlying real estate assets which they believed were undervalued. They were correct in this assumption and would later tear down many of the centrally located old theaters to build apartments and hotels reaping millions in profits.

The pair soon diversified the business, successfully venturing into a variety of areas. In 1968, Loews acquired Lorillard, the 5th largest tobacco company in the United States at the time, which owned the popular brands Kent, Newport and True. In 1974, they purchased a controlling interest in the nearly bankrupt insurance company, CNA Financial Corporation. This too was very successful and several years later it held an A+ credit rating. They also purchased the Bulova Watch Company.

Through acquisitions, Tisch built Loews' into a highly profitable conglomerate (with 14 hotels, 67 movie theaters, CNA Financial, Bulova, and Lorillard) with revenues increasing from $100 million in 1970 to more than $3 billion in 1980.

In 2002, the year before Larry Tisch's death, the corporation had revenues of more than $17 billion and assets of more than $70 billion.

CBS
In 1986, CBS Inc. was the target of several hostile takeover attempts by the likes of Ted Turner, Marvin Davis, and Ivan Boesky. Tisch was invited by CBS to invest in the company so as to help stop the hostile advances. Tisch spent $750 million for a 24.9% stake in CBS and a seat on the board. Later, with the support of company patriarch William S. Paley, he was named the company's president and CEO.

The Tisch era at CBS was marked by relentless cost-cutting: Tisch fired 230 out of 1,200 news employees and cut $30 million from the news division's budget. CBS divested itself of non-broadcast assets. In 1986, he sold the book publisher Holt, Rinehart and Winston to Harcourt Brace Jovanovich for $500 million; in 1987, he sold the CBS magazine division to Diamandis Communications; and also in 1987, he sold the CBS Music Group, the 2nd largest record company in the world at the time, to Sony for $2 billion. Westinghouse Electric bought CBS in 1995 for an estimated $5.4 billion, of which Tisch's ownership netted him $2 billion. Although Tisch's decade long tenure at CBS was marked by a 15% annual increase in the value of its stock, CBS remained in third place out of the big three national networks. Tisch was criticized for not understanding the broadcast business, not diversifying the business after selling its non-broadcast assets, and poor performance of CBS relative to its peers. John Gutfreund, CEO of Salomon Brothers compared him with Bill Paley, the founder of CBS: "Bill had a vision for the industry, for Larry, it is a business."

Philanthropy

Tisch made major donations to the Metropolitan Museum of Art, New York University, the NYU Medical Center and the Wildlife Conservation Society. A $4.5 million gift created the Tisch Children's Zoo in Central Park.

From 1978 to 1998, Tisch served as chairman of the board of trustees at New York University overseeing a $1 billion capital campaign and major improvements in the university. Tisch was also a former president of the United Jewish Appeal of New York.

NYU's Tisch School of the Arts is named in honor of him and his brother Bob, who donated the funds necessary to buy a building for the school.  Tisch's donations also provided funding for a professorship in law, which was established in 2010 and is held by noted legal scholar Richard Epstein. There is additionally a Tisch Hall at the Stern School of Business and a Tisch Hospital at the NYU Medical Center.

The professorship for history and economics in Harvard University is named after him in recognition of his philanthropy to the school. The current Laurence A. Tisch professor is Niall Ferguson, a Scottish economic historian.

Family
Tisch married Wilma "Billie" Stein in 1948; they had four sons:
Andrew H. Tisch
Daniel R. Tisch – runs a family fund, Mentor Partners, and sits on the New York University board. He is the father of David Tisch.
James S. Tisch
Thomas Jonah Tisch – Works as a partner at FLF Associates, a private investment group in New York City. In 1985, he married Helen Vivian Scovell.

All four boys went to Suffield Academy in Suffield, Connecticut.

Death
Laurence Tisch died of gastroesophageal cancer, aged 80, in 2003. He was interred at Westchester Hills Cemetery in Hastings-on-Hudson, New York.

References

External links
TV Museum archive
Tisch obit in USA Today

1923 births
2003 deaths
American billionaires
American mass media owners
Wharton School of the University of Pennsylvania alumni
New York University Stern School of Business alumni
American people of Russian-Jewish descent
Jewish American philanthropists
Philanthropists from New York (state)
People from Brooklyn
Laurence Tisch
Paramount Global people
CBS executives
CBS chief executive officers
Deaths from cancer in New York (state)
Burials at Westchester Hills Cemetery
American real estate businesspeople